Edward Garrison may refer to:

 Edward H. Garrison, American jockey
 Edward B. Garrison, American art historian